Corazón traicionado (Betrayed heart) is a Venezuelan telenovela written by Martín Hahn and produced by RCTV. The series stars Yelena Maciel, Cristóbal Lander, Norkys Batista and Caridad Canelón.

Corazón traicionado began airing in Honduras on 14 August 2017. On September 22, 2017, the telenovela debuted in Africa on the channel Eva dubbed in English and Portuguese.

Plot
Lorena García discovers that her husband Guillermo is a hit man who has recently been involved in the attempted assassination of Marco Aurelio Corona,  a prestigious lawyer in Caracas. After a failed attempt, Guillermo and his boss kidnap her 5-year-old son and force her to work as a nurse taking care of Marco Aurelio at his family house so that she can kill him if she wanted to see her son again. She comes face to face with Alberto, Marco Aurelio's son, who was her past love when she was a teenager working at his family's country house.

Cast

Main 
Yelena Maciel as Lorena García
Cristóbal Lander as Alberto Corona Sotillo
Norkys Batista as Malena Corona Sotillo
Caridad Canelón as Gertrudis Sotillo de Corona

Also starring 
Julio Alcázar as Don Lucio Trejo
Aroldo Betancourt as Marco Aurelio Corona
Estefanía López as Carmen Ramírez
Gonzalo Velutini as Claudio Corona
Saúl Marín as Alfonso Valeria
Josette Vidal as Virginia Ramírez
Patricia Amenta as Patricia Santana
Claudio de la Torre as Pablo Miranda
Ángel Casallas as Ricardo Trejo Sotillo
Carmen Alicia Lara as Isabel Miranda
Ángel David Díaz as Guillermo Páez
Oriana Colmenares as María Bonita Echeverri
Milena Santander as Paulina Sotillo de Trejo
Margarita Hernández as María Lourdes Echeverri
Catherina Cardozo as María Balbina Echeverri
Violeta Alemán as Nilda Páez
Juan Carlos Gardié as Pedro Lobo
Mariú Favaro as Norma Ríos
Alejandro Díaz Iacocca as Elvis Trejo Sotillo
Xavier Muñoz as Comisario Omar González
Graziella Mazzone as María Ángeles Echeverri
Luigi Luciano Bonilla Dileonardo as José Pablo Miranda Corona
Fernando E. Márquez Aristiguieta as Ignacio Páez García

Production
In October 2015, it was announced that Martín Hahn was writing a new telenovela to be produced by Radio Caracas Television. Production of Corazón traicionado started on November 23, 2015.

References

External links

Venezuelan telenovelas
RCTV telenovelas
2017 Venezuelan television series debuts
2018 Venezuelan television series endings
Spanish-language telenovelas
2017 telenovelas
Television shows set in Caracas